Funtasia Water Park is an amusement and water park located in Patna, India. The park contains many attractions such as numerous water slides and water playgrounds. The park is the first water park in Bihar. The park is owned and administered by Mumbai-based Takshila Seas & Resorts Private Limited.

Location
The water theme park is located on the New Bypass road. It is 11 km away from Patna Junction and about 16 km from Patna Airport.

Park attractions
Water slides
Wave pool
Swimming pools
Kids water slides
Two Kids wave pool
Multi cuisine restaurant
Coffee shops, Souvenir's shop, Banquet hall

La tomatina  Holi
In March 2013, the Holi festival was celebrated on the pattern of La Tomatina, a traditional Spanish festival in which participants throw tomatoes and get involved in this tomato fight purely for fun. Nearly 1000 kg of tomatoes were squashed.

See also
List of water parks

References

External links

Tourist attractions in Patna
Parks in Patna
2012 establishments in Bihar
Amusement parks in India
Water parks in India